The Dark Brotherhood may refer to:

 Sonic Chronicles: The Dark Brotherhood, a video game by Sega.
 "The Dark Brotherhood", a short story in H. P. Lovecraft's collection The Dark Brotherhood and Other Pieces
 Dark Brotherhood, a guild of assassins in The Elder Scrolls video game series
 Brotherhood Outcasts, a Brotherhood of Steel splinter group in Fallout 3

See also 
 Black Brotherhood
 Brotherhood of Darkness